is a railway station on the Gantoku Line in Iwakuni, Yamaguchi, Japan, operated by the West Japan Railway Company (JR West).

Lines
Nishi-Iwakuni Station is served by the Gantoku Line.

Adjacent stations

History
The station opened on 15 April 1929, initially named Iwakuni Station. It was renamed Nishi-Iwakuni in 1942, and at the same time, the original Marifu Station was renamed Iwakuni Station.

Surrounding area
 Iwakuni Prison

See also
 List of railway stations in Japan

References

External links

  

Railway stations in Japan opened in 1929
Railway stations in Yamaguchi Prefecture